Isabell Werth (born 21 July 1969 in Issum) is a German equestrian and world champion in dressage who competed in the Olympics six times (1992, 1996, 2000, 2008, 2016, 2020) winning twelve medals, seven of them gold. She holds the record for the most Olympic medals won by any equestrian athlete.

Career
Werth rode Gigolo, owned by Uwe Schulten-Baumer, her coach from 1986 until 2001.   On Gigolo, she won all her championships between 1992 and 2000, save for the 1999 European Championships in Arnheim, where she rode Anthony FRH. In 2006, she started riding Warum Nicht FRH at the international level and with him won the 2007 World Cup in Las Vegas. Warum Nicht retired in 2012. Werth competed at the Olympic Games with Satchmo, who subsequently retired in November 2011. In 2010, Werth started riding El Santo at the international level until the horse was transferred in 2016 to Spanish rider José Antonio Garcia Mena. In 2016, Werth secured the ride on Weihegold Old, with whom she won the team gold medal and a silver medal in the Individual Dressage at the Rio Olympics.

Isabell Werth worked alongside Bates Australia to develop the Isabell Dressage Saddle available in Bates and Wintec.

International championship results

Notable horses

 Weingart – 1984 Chestnut Hanoverian Mare (Weinstock x Winkel)
 1989 European Championships – Team Gold Medal, Individual 13th Place
 Gigolo FRH – 1983 Chestnut Hanoverian Gelding (Graditz x Busoni XX)
 1991 European Championships – Team Gold Medal, Individual Gold Medal
 1992 Barcelona Olympics – Team Gold Medal, Individual Silver Medal
 1993 European Championships – Team Gold Medal, Individual Gold Medal
 1994 World Equestrian Games – Team Gold Medal, Individual Silver
 1996 Atlanta Olympics – Team Gold Medal, Individual Gold Medal
 1998 World Equestrian Games – Team Gold Medal, Individual Gold Medal
 2000 Sydney Olympics – Team Gold Medal, Individual Silver Medal
 Antony FRH – 1986 Dark Bay Hanoverian Gelding (Argument x Wenzel I)
 1999 European Championships – Team Gold Medal, Individual 16th Place
 2000 FEI World Cup Final – Fourth Place
 2001 FEI World Cup Final – Silver Medal
 2001 European Championships – Team Gold Medal, Individual 16th Place
 2002 FEI World Cup Final – Fifth Place
 2003 FEI World Cup Final – Fourth Place
 Satchmo 78 – 1994 Dark Bay Hanoverian Gelding (São Paulo x Legat)
 2003 European Championships – Team Gold Medal, Individual 17th Place
 2006 World Equestrian Games – Team Gold Medal, Individual Gold Medal, Individual Bronze Medal Freestyle
 2007 European Championships – Team Silver Medal, Individual Gold Medal, Individual Silver Medal Freestyle
 2008 Beijing Olympics – Team Gold Medal, Individual Silver Medal
 2009 FEI World Cup Final – Silver Medal
 2011 FEI World Cup Final – Fifth Place
 Apache OLD – 1993 Bay Oldenburg Gelding (Alabaster x Grundstein I)
 2004 FEI World Cup Final – Ninth Place
 Warum Nicht FRH – 1996 Chestnut Hanoverian Gelding (Weltmeyer x Wenzel I)
 2006 FEI World Cup Final – Silver Medal
 2007 FEI World Cup Final – Gold Medal
 2008 FEI World Cup Final – Silver Medal
 2010 FEI World Cup Final – Fourth Place
 2010 World Equestrian Games – Team Bronze Medal, Individual Tenth Place, Individual Sixth Place Freestyle
 El Santo NRW – 2001 Bay Rheinlander Gelding (Ehrentusch x Rythmus)
 2011 European Championships – Team Silver Medal, Individual Seventh Place, Individual Seventh Place Freestyle
 2012 FEI World Cup Final – Fourth Place
 2014 FEI World Cup Final – Fifth Place
 2015 FEI World Cup Final – Sixth Place
 Don Johnson FRH – 2001 Bay Hanoverian Gelding (Don Frederico x Warkant)
 2013 FEI World Cup Final – Fifth Place
 2013 European Championships – Team Gold Medal, Individual 20th Place
 2015 European Championships – Team Bronze Medal, Individual Seventh Place, Individual Fourth Place Freestyle
 Bella Rose 2 – 2004 Chestnut Westfalen Mare (Belissimo x Cacir AA)
 2014 World Equestrian Games – Team Gold Medal
 2018 World Equestrian Games – Team Gold Medal, Special Gold Medal
2019 European Championships – Team Gold Medal, Special Gold Medal, Freestyle Gold Medal
 Weihegold OLD – 2005 Black Oldenburg Mare (Don Schufro x Sandro Hit)
 2016 Rio Olympics – Team Gold Medal, Individual Silver Medal
 2017 FEI World Cup Final – Gold Medal
 2017 European Championships – Team Gold Medal, Individual Gold Medal, Individual Gold Medal Freestyle
 2018 FEI World Cup Final – Gold Medal
 2019 FEI World Cup Final – Gold Medal

Doping
On 24 June 2009, the forbidden substance fluphenazine was found in the A-sample from Werth's horse Whisper at a Whitsun tournament at Wiesbaden. She was suspended from all tournaments by the International Federation for Equestrian Sports (FEI). On 2 September 2009, the suspension was set by the FEI to six months from 23 June.

Werth subsequently stated that the drug was given to the horse to treat equine shivers—mainly for the safety of the horse's handlers—and that she does not believe the drug influences a horse's ability to compete.

Computer game 
In 2007, a PC Game was released called "Isabell Werth – Reitsport".  Made by French company Dancing Dots / German publisher Frogster Interactive, it is an Equestrian Simulation with 3-day Eventing, Show Jumping and Cross-Country Riding.  Isabell Werth takes a part as an on-screen trainer, giving advice and pointers on how to ride and handle horses during training and eventing.  Now out of print, the original websites can be seen at the Internet Archive Wabac machine, and the game itself is now available at Big Fish Games retitled – "Ride! Equestrian Simulation", with a French-man replacing Isabell as the trainer.  Isabell's game character file is still in the data structure of the game, and using a patch still available, the game executable can be overwritten, converting it to the original German version, except for the German instructional audio which is missing.

See also
List of multiple Olympic gold medalists in one event
List of multiple Summer Olympic medalists

References

External links
 
 
 
 
 Isabell Werth official website 
 2000 Olympic Equestrian Results
 

Equestrians at the 1992 Summer Olympics
Equestrians at the 1996 Summer Olympics
Equestrians at the 2000 Summer Olympics
Equestrians at the 2008 Summer Olympics
Equestrians at the 2016 Summer Olympics
Equestrians at the 2020 Summer Olympics
Horse-related video games
German dressage riders
Olympic equestrians of Germany
German female equestrians
Olympic gold medalists for Germany
Olympic silver medalists for Germany
Members of the Order of Merit of North Rhine-Westphalia
People from Wesel (district)
Sportspeople from Düsseldorf (region)
German sportspeople in doping cases
1969 births
Living people
Olympic medalists in equestrian
Medalists at the 1992 Summer Olympics
Medalists at the 1996 Summer Olympics
Medalists at the 2000 Summer Olympics
Medalists at the 2008 Summer Olympics
Medalists at the 2016 Summer Olympics
Medalists at the 2020 Summer Olympics